Nikolás Sánchez Izquierdo (born 17 March 1999) is a Spanish tennis player.

Sánchez Izquierdo has a career high ATP singles ranking of 298 achieved on 7 June 2022 and a career high ATP doubles ranking of 562 achieved on 29 November 2021.

Future/ITF World Tennis Tour and Challenger finals

Singles: 11 (6–5)

Doubles: 2 (1–1)

References

External links

1999 births
Living people
Tennis players from Barcelona
Spanish male tennis players